The 2019–20 season was UANL's third competitive season and third season in the Liga MX Femenil, the top flight of Mexican women's football.

Tigres UANL started the season under new manager Roberto Medina, after Ramón Villa Zevallos left to Guadalajara; Medina previously managed Mexico women's national football senior and U-20 teams.

In the first half of the season, UANL classified to the playoffs and reached the Apertura 2019 final, losing against Monterrey in a rematch of the previous tournament final, which Tigres won.

For the second half of the season, on 22 May 2020, the Clausura tournament was canceled due to the COVID-19 pandemic; in that moment UANL was ranked first.

Squad

Apertura

Clausura

Transfers

In

Out

Coaching staff

Competitions

Overview

Torneo Apertura

League table

Matches

Playoffs

Quarterfinals

Semifinals

Final

Torneo Clausura

League table

Matches

Statistics

Appearances and goals

|-

|-
! colspan=10 style=background:#dcdcdc | Players that left the club during the season
|-

|}

Goalscorers

Hat-tricks

References

Tigres UANL (women) seasons
Mexican football clubs 2019–20 season